Stealware refers to a type of malware that covertly transfers money or data to a third party.

Specifically, stealware uses an HTTP cookie to redirect the commission ordinarily earned by the site for referring users to another site.

References

External links
Definition at Spyware.co.uk

Internet Protocol based network software
Types of malware